George Chowne (died 1616), of Fairlawn, near Wrotham and Little Peckham, Kent, was an English politician.

Chowne was the son of MP, Nicholas Chowne. He was a Member of Parliament (MP) for Rochester in 1593.

References

16th-century births
1616 deaths
People from Wrotham
English MPs 1593